Elizabeth Mae "Lzzy" Hale (born October 10, 1983) is an American musician, best known as the lead singer and rhythm guitarist of hard rock band Halestorm, which she co-founded with her brother Arejay Hale in 1997.

Career
Hale began writing and performing music in 1997, when she founded Halestorm with her brother Arejay Hale. She has since gained success as Halestorm's lead singer, and with guest appearances alongside artists such as Eric Church, Lindsey Stirling, Shinedown, Machine Gun Kelly, Black Stone Cherry, Seether, Adrenaline Mob, Ray Wylie Hubbard, the Hu, and Stone Sour.

Revolver appearances
In the December 2009 issue of Revolver magazine, Hale appeared on the cover alongside former Landmine Marathon vocalist Grace Perry as one of the "Hottest Chicks in Metal". For most years since, Hale has been listed as one of the magazine's "Hottest" either in the magazine and/or in its Hottest Chicks calendar.  For the magazine's February/March 2015 issue, Hale appeared alone on the cover for both a feature article and once more as one of Revolver'''s "25 hottest chicks in hard rock and metal".

Hale has also written the advice column "Ask Lzzy" for Revolver.

Gibson promotion
In 2021, Gibson announced that Hale was being named the first female Gibson brand ambassador. A long-time fan and user, Hale had previously partnered with Gibson to design the Limited Edition Lzzy Hale Explorer guitar. As a brand ambassador, it was announced Hale would help create new signature models from Gibson, Epiphone, and Kramer.

During Halestorm's tour with The Pretty Reckless in 2022, Hale gifted a white Gibson Explorer to guitarist Daniela Villarreal from The Warning during the middle of their opening set. The making of the guitar was a collaborative effort between Hale and Gibson.

Guest appearances

As a musical artist Hale has collaborated with a number of other notable bands. Some of the songs she has lent vocals to include:
 Daughtry's cover song Separate Ways (Worlds Apart) from Daughtry's upcoming 7th studio album.
 Shinedown songs "Shed Some Light" (on Us and Them) and "Breaking Inside" (on The Sound of Madness). 
 Device's cover song "Close My Eyes Forever" (on Device)
 Trans-Siberian Orchestra's "Forget About the Blame (Moon Version)" (on Letters From the Labyrinth)
 Lindsey Stirling's title track "Shatter Me" (on Shatter Me)
 Black Stone Cherry's "Won't Let Go" (on Between the Devil & the Deep Blue Sea)
 Adrenaline Mob's cover of "Come Undone" (on Omertá) originally by Duran Duran
 Stone Sour's cover of "Gimme Shelter" (on Straight Outta Burbank...) originally by the Rolling Stones
Machine Gun Kelly's "Spotlight" (on General Admission)
Dada Life's track "Tic Tic Tic"
Dream Theater track "Our New World" (single, 2016)
New Years Day's cover of "Only Happy When It Rains" (on Diary of a Creep) originally by Garbage. Also performed live at the 2017 Alternative Press Music Awards.
 On April 7, 2018, Hale, backed by Cane Hill, played wrestler Ember Moon to the ring for her NXT Women's title defence against Shayna Baszler, performing her entrance theme "Free the Flame" at NXT TakeOver: New Orleans.
 Tom Keifer's cover of "Nobody's Fool" (bonus track on 2017's version of The Way Life Goes) originally by Cinderella
"Planet Rock All Stars" cover of John Farnham's "You're the Voice", a charity single to raise money for the mental health charity, Mind
 Mark Morton's cover of "She Talks to Angels" (on Ether) originally by the Black Crowes
 In This Moment's cover of "We Will Rock You" (on Mother) originally by Queen
 A remix of the Hu's "Song of Women"
 Cory Marks's track "Out in the Rain" (on Who I Am)
 Evanescence track "Use My Voice" 
 Apocalyptica's track "Talk to Me" 
 Dee Snider's track "The Magic of Christmas Day", initially publicly released as "The Magic of Christmas Day (God Bless Us Everyone)" by Celine Dion on These Are Special Times The Picturebooks's track "Rebel" (on The Major Minor Collective) 
“Cruel Game” performed by the fictional band the Relentless in the television series “Paradise City” on Amazon Prime Video
Slothrust's track "The Next Curse"
 Avatar's track "Violence No Matter What" from the album Dance Devil Dance

Other activities
In 2020, Hale was made the host of the third season of “A Year in Music” on AXS TV, which she continued to host in season four. She was also a judge on the inaugural season of the television show “No Cover”, a music competition show where unsigned bands and artists performed original songs with the hope of winning a record contract.

Awards and nominations

Personal life
Hale is the fourth Elizabeth Mae in her family, she said in an interview for Loudwire'''s "Wikipedia Fact or Fiction".

On October 11, 2014, Hale said she is bisexual on her personal Twitter account. In 2015, bandmate Josh Smith confirmed that Hale was in a relationship with fellow Halestorm guitarist Joe Hottinger, and in 2021, Hale stated on Twitter, “I’m a bi gal in an 18-year relationship with a man.“

On February 29, 2020, Hale performed at Nashville SC's inaugural Major League Soccer match at Nissan Stadium.

Hale often speaks out about the importance of supporting one's mental health. In 2018, she started the #RaiseYourHorns trend online following the suicide of Huntress vocalist Jill Janus, resulting in thousands of pictures being posted online from celebrities and rock fans sharing their own experiences with mental illness.

References

External links

 
 Halestorm at Atlantic Records
 GRAMMY Award Results for Lzzy Hale

Living people
American women heavy metal singers
American rock guitarists
Grammy Award winners
People from Red Lion, Pennsylvania
Singers from Pennsylvania
American hard rock musicians
Bisexual singers
Bisexual songwriters
Bisexual women
American LGBT singers
American LGBT songwriters
LGBT people from Pennsylvania
1983 births
20th-century American women guitarists
21st-century American women guitarists
Guitarists from Pennsylvania
20th-century American women singers
21st-century American women singers
20th-century American LGBT people
21st-century American LGBT people
American bisexual writers